The RJR Championship was a golf tournament on the Champions Tour from 1987 to 2002. It was played in Clemmons, North Carolina at Tanglewood Park.

The purse for the 2002 tournament was US$1,600,000, with $240,000 going to the winner. The tournament was founded in 1987 as the Vantage Championship with Vantage cigarettes as the sponsor, although it switched to the corporate-branded RJR Championship in 1989 and 2002, the latter due to the Tobacco Master Settlement Agreement; R.J. Reynolds Tobacco Company were restricted to one sports sponsorship in the rulings developed by the settlement, to which the company opted to choose NASCAR Winston Cup Series as the cigarette-branded sponsorship that lasted until 2003.

Winners
RJR Championship
2002 Bruce Fleisher

Vantage Championship
2001 canceled due to the September 11, 2001 attacks
2000 Larry Nelson
1999 Fred Gibson
1998 Gil Morgan
1997 Hale Irwin
1996 Jim Colbert
1995 Hale Irwin
1994 Larry Gilbert
1993 Lee Trevino
1992 Jim Colbert
1991 Jim Colbert
1990 Charles Coody

RJR Championship
1989 Gary Player

Vantage Championship
1988 Walt Zembriski
1987 Al Geiberger

Source:

References

Former PGA Tour Champions events
Golf in North Carolina